Attack on Leningrad, or just Leningrad, is a 2009 war film written and directed by Aleksandr Buravsky, set during the Siege of Leningrad.

Plot 
In 1941 Nazi Germany invaded the Soviet Union and their troops besieged the city of Leningrad. A group of foreign journalists are flown in for one day, but one of them, Kate Davis (Mira Sorvino), is presumed dead and misses the flight out. Alone in the city, she is helped by Nina Tsvetkova (Olga Sutulova), a young and idealist police officer, and together they fight for their own and other people's survival.

Cast 
 Gabriel Byrne as Phillip Parker
 Mira Sorvino as Kate Davis
 Aleksandr Abdulov as Chigasov
 Vladimir Ilyin as Malinin
 Mikhail Yefremov as Omelchenko
 Mikhail Trukhin as Vernik
 Yevgeni Sidikhin as Korneyev
 Olga Sutulova as Nina Tsvetkova
 Kirill Lavrov as Radio announcer
 Armin Mueller-Stahl as Field Marshal Von Leeb
 Alexander Beyer as Walter Hoesdorff
 Yevgeny Stychkin as Kapitsa
 Valentina Talyzina as Valentina

 Ecki Hoffmann (Ekard Khoffman) as Adolf Hitler  (Gitler)

References

External links 
 
 
 

2000s Russian-language films
2000s war drama films
2009 films
British war drama films
Russian historical drama films
Russian war drama films
Siege films
War epic films
Eastern Front of World War II films
Films set in Saint Petersburg
Films set in the 1940s
Films about the Soviet Union in the Stalin era
World War II films based on actual events
2009 drama films
Russian World War II films
British World War II films
2000s British films
Cultural depictions of Adolf Hitler